The Wilkes-Barre Barons were a basketball team from Wilkes-Barre, Pennsylvania. 

The Barons played between 1933 and 1980 in different American leagues. The team won 11 titles during this time, including while playing in the American Basketball League and the Continental Basketball Association.  The team was owned and coached by Eddie White, Sr.  They played in the Kingston Armory, as well as Kings College and Coughlin High School, in their latter years.

Wilkes-Barre Barons (ABL) I
The Wilkes-Barre Barons were an American basketball team based in Wilkes-Barre, Pennsylvania that was a member of the American Basketball League.

During the 1939/40 season, the team dropped out of the league on February 2, 1940.

Year-by-year

Wilkes-Barre Barons (ABL) II
The Wilkes-Barre Barons were an American basketball team based in Wilkes-Barre, Pennsylvania that was a member of the Eastern Pennsylvania Basketball League and the American Basketball League.  The franchise was one of six original teams in the EPBL, and won the 1946-1947 President's Cup playoffs that season before moving to the American Basketball League.  In 1955, the Barons returned to the Eastern League, and won seven more championships between 1955 and 1978.  The aftereffects of Hurricane Agnes forced the Barons to fold midway through the 1973-74 season; the team returned to action for the 1975-76 season.   For the 1979-80 season they were rebranded as the Pennsylvania Barons; this would be the team's last year in Wilkes-Barre.  (The team played the 1980-81 CBA season in Scranton as the Scranton Aces before folding completely.)

Year-by-year

References

Defunct basketball teams in the United States
Continental Basketball Association teams
American Basketball League (1925–1955) teams
Basketball teams established in 1914
Wilkes-Barre, Pennsylvania
Basketball teams in Pennsylvania
Basketball teams disestablished in 1980
Sports in the Scranton–Wilkes-Barre metropolitan area
1914 establishments in Pennsylvania
1980 disestablishments in Pennsylvania